In mathematics, a brownian sheet is a multiparametric generalization of the brownian motion to a gaussian random field.

The exact dimension  of the space of the new time parameter varies from authors.

(n,d)-Brownian sheet 
A -dimensional gaussian process  is called a -brownian sheet if
 it has zero mean, i.e.  for all 
 for the covariance function

Properties 
From the definition follows

almost surely.

Examples 
-brownian sheet is a one-dimensional brownian motion  on the index set .

Literature

References 

Wiener process
Robert Brown (botanist, born 1773)